Allium baytopiorum, or Baytop's onion, is a species of onion that is endemic to Kars Province in Turkey. It is found in montane steppe at about 1,200 m elevation.  The species was named in honor of Turkish botanist Asuman Baytop.

Critically endangered
It is threatened by overgrazing and hay making.

References

baytopiorum
Critically endangered plants
Endemic flora of Turkey